Sir Ralph Assheton, 2nd Baronet (11 February 1651 – 3 May 1716) of Middleton Hall and Whalley Abbey, Lancashire, was an English landowner and politician who represented Liverpool (1677–79) and Lancashire (1694–98) as a Member of Parliament.

Early life 
Baptised on 19 February 1651 in Middleton in Lancashire, he was the son of Sir Ralph Assheton, 1st Baronet, of Middleton, and Anne Assheton, daughter of Sir Ralph Assheton, 1st Baronet, of Great Lever. Assheton was educated at Brasenose College, Oxford, where he matriculated in 1668. In 1665, he succeeded to his father's baronetcy and in 1696, he inherited the family's estates in Downham near Whalley, Lancashire from his uncle Sir John Assheton, 4th Baronet, of Lever.

Career 
From March 1677 to 1679, Assheton was Member of Parliament (MP) for Liverpool and from 1694 to 1698 for Lancashire. He was a Justice of the Peace for Lancashire from 1675 to 1687 and from 1689 until his death. He died, aged 65, and was buried at Middleton. In the baronetcy, he was succeeded by his nephew, Sir Ralph Assheton, 3rd Baronet, of Middleton.

Assheton had a private book collection of some significance and works from his collection can be identified by the presence of his engraved bookplate.

Family 
Assheton had married firstly Mary Vavasour, the daughter of Thomas Vavasour of Spaldington, Yorkshire, with whom he had one son (who predeceased him) and three daughters. He married, secondly, to Mary Hyde, the daughter of Robert Hyde of Denton, Lancashire. His daughter Catherine Assheton (d.1728) married Thomas Lister (1688–1745).

References

1651 births
1716 deaths
Alumni of Brasenose College, Oxford
Baronets in the Baronetage of England
Members of the Parliament of England (pre-1707) for Liverpool
English MPs 1661–1679
English MPs 1695–1698
People from Middleton, Greater Manchester
Lancashire Militia officers